Eden Valley is an inner-city suburb of Auckland, the largest and most populous urban area in New Zealand.  The suburb grew around Dominion Road, one of the Auckland’s main arterial routes. Eden Valley's commercial hub is made up of a collection of businesses, shops, and dining options that service the area. The eclectic collection of shop fronts and signage on Dominion Road has aptly been described as, "colour and chaos".  The "colour and chaos" of the commercial hub is strongly contrasted by the surrounding residential area. Eden Valley is characterized by heritage buildings that house modern day businesses, a residential area that has a range of late Victorian, Edwardian and transitional bay villas, and basalt and scoria stone walls that give the area a long established feel.

Eden Valley is located 3.5 km south of the Auckland Central Business District. Dominion Road makes up the spine of Eden Valley; it runs south from Eden Terrace to Waikowhai – almost the length of the Auckland isthmus. Eden Valley itself has no definitive beginning or end, but generally runs from View Road to Ballantyne Square with the intersection of Valley Road and Dominion Road as its central axis from which the suburb radiates out. Maungawhau provides a navigational landmark to the east and Eden Park is located to the west. Dominion Road traverses some of Auckland’s early lava flows from volcanic Maungawhau and Te Tatua-a-Riukiuta; the undulations of the road clearly indicate the location of these flows.

History
Eden Valley, as a city suburb, originated as farmland before it was subdivided for residential use and commercial development followed. During the 1840s, John Walters, George Nicol and James Brown were early landowners of Eden Valley, holding substantial land for farming and quarrying stone.   Auckland’s volcanic landscape was a blessing for the area; the fertile volcanic soil produced a variety of crops (wheat being extensively grown in the 1850s)  and the volcanic stone proved to be a suitable material for road making.

Suburban development in Auckland depended on the availability of land, affordable transport, and desire of the middle class to move out of the crowded inner city. Auckland experienced significant growth in population between 1874 and 1886, putting pressure on the areas closest to the city. The population growth combined with public transportation extending outside of the present city centre in the early 1880s created prime conditions for landowners to subdivide their properties for residential use.  Eden Valley's commercial hub began to develop in the 1880s, but it was not until the early 1900s that the development really took off.

The development and expansion of Dominion Road from 1900 to 1930 mirrored that in nearby Mt Eden village. The principal corner sites were redeveloped with Edwardian two-storey shops with dwellings above. The number of shops increased in the 1920s after the intersection of Dominion Road and Valley Road became the end of the tram line.

Transport
In Mt Eden, the plentiful supply of volcanic stone (a suitable material for building roads), as well as, the ready supply of labourers from the Mt Eden Prison, allowed for a progressive development of early roads, many of which still exist today as main arterial routes.   Toll gates were established on several main roads, including Mt Eden Road and Dominion Road, during the 19th century in order to help pay for their upkeep.

Public transportation extended from the inner city to the surrounding areas in the late 1870s and early 1880s with horse-drawn buses being the first mode of regular public transportation in the late 1870s.  In 1881 the long-awaited railway came, connecting Newmarket with Helensville with stops in Mt Eden, Kingsland, Morningside and Mt Albert.   At the beginning of the 20th century, trams began connecting Mt. Eden, Balmoral, Kingsland, and Mt Albert with the city. The trams ran for the last time in the 1950s.

Politics
Eden Valley falls on the border between the Epsom and Mt Albert constituencies for national Parliament.  In terms of local government, Eden Valley comes under the Albert-Eden Local Board,  of Auckland Council. The Albert-Eden Local Board includes the suburbs of Waterview, Point Chevalier, Sandringham, Mount Albert, Morningside, Owairaka, Balmoral, Kingsland, Mount Eden, Epsom and Greenlane.

During the 19th century, the planning and maintenance of the main arterial roads (Mt Eden Road and Dominion Road) provided the impetus to form local governing bodies in the area. The Mt Eden Highway Board held its first meeting in 1868; it covered the area of Mt Eden, Eden Valley, Sandringham, and Balmoral.  At the time it was responsible for building and maintaining the roads, and for dealing with the pigs, horses, cattle, and sheep that freely roamed the area. In 1882, it became the Mt Eden Road Board. In 1906, Mt Eden gained borough status and the Mt Eden Borough Council was formed. In 1989 the Borough Council amalgamated with Auckland City Council in a nationwide local government reorganisation. And in November 2010, the council was dissolved and it became a ward of the Auckland Council.

Landmarks and features

Dominion Road

Dominion Road is a main arterial route in Auckland running north-south across most of the central isthmus. The road is also a major public transport route which carries 50,000 bus passengers each week, making it one of the few roads in Auckland on which similar or greater numbers of people travel by public transport than by private car.

Dominion Road began as a track created by early landowner, John Walters, connecting his property to Eden Terrace at the Whau Road (present day New North Road).  Dominion Road, originally known as Mt Roskill Road,  was further developed over the years because contractors needed the road to cart basalt and scoria from Mount Roskill and Three Kings quarries.  A toll booth near Railway Bridge collected tolls from road users to fund its maintenance. New Zealand received dominion status in 1907  and Mt Roskill Road was renamed Dominion Road in recognition of this achievement.

Notable buildings
Eden Valley has a significant number of commercial buildings from the 1920s and 1930s, some of which retain the original or early shop front and interior details. These buildings are a character supporting feature of the neighbourhood.

 Girl Guide Hall – now the home of the Girl Guide Association's provincial headquarters. The building was built in 1865 as a "Selwyn" Church, known as St Sepulchre’s.  It served as an Anglican Morturary Chapel standing in the grounds of the Symonds Street Cemetery. It was moved from Symonds Street to its current location in 1904 when it became a Baptist church. Beginning in 1963 it was used by the St Albans Boy Scouts, the Eden Operatic and Dramatic Society, and the Eden-Epsom Day Care. It has been used by the Guides since the 1970s.
 St Barnabas' Church - also a Selwyn church
 St Albans Church - Anglican. This was the first church to be built on Dominion Road built in 1886. The site was given to the project by James Paice, one of the largest land owners in the area, and the funds were raised Captain H.G. Ewington. Built as a small wooden building, the church was renovated to make more room in 1905. A new brick apse was added in the front during the renovation.  The church was then converted into a parish in 1909. The design is an authentic replica of a portion of the cathedral church of St Alban in England. The design incorporates a mixture of Gothic and Norman influences. The brick apse, in particular, features the Norman style. Several congregations worship here to help make up the twelve acts of public worship that occur throughout every week. These include Hindi speaking Anglicans in Tikanga Pasifika whose Parish is called Anugrah (Grace), also the Eritrean Orthodox originating from North Africa and Indian Orthodox (Saint Dionysius).
 Russian Orthodox Church of the Resurrection 447A Dominion Rd, Mt Eden, Auckland, New Zealand. Small wooden structure distinguished by the onion dome typical of old Russian architecture.
 Methodist Church - Dominion Road. Red Brick Gothic church built in 1926 to the designs of Arthur White.
 Symphonia Hall - Cnr Dominion Road and St Albans Avenue. Former Cinema now used as the headquarter of the Auckland Philamonia Orchestra.

Parks
Ballantyne Square is a green space located at the corner of Dominion Road and Ewington Ave.  The square provides a respite from surrounding urban activity and is distinguished by its large specimen trees. Ballantyne Square was named after the late Doreen Ballantyne, who was a local councillor from 1965 to 1976.

Bellevue Reserve is a recreational space that has a playground and picnic tables. Originally Bellevue Square was the site of a scoria stone pit, quarried by early landowners, James Walters and his father John Walters in the early 1880s. In 1885 the land was vested as a reserve by the Domain Board. It was levelled and landscaped during the 1920s.

Nga Ana Wai
The underground rivers that are running through the area are known by the Maori as Nga Ana Wai, which translates to ‘the watery caves'. These ancient lava caverns were created 30,000 years ago during the eruption of Mount Albert and Maungawhau (Mount Eden). Water springs up at various locations including Eden Park grounds, which used to be swamp land.

Popular culture

The Mutton Birds' song

"Dominion Road" was written by Don McGlashan and was released as a single in 1992. The Mutton Birds are a well-known New Zealand band, formed in 1991. The song "Dominion Road" features the eponymous Auckland arterial route. The music video has shots of forgotten shops on Dominion Road from 1992. In 2013, an anonymous artist installed a plaque on the footpath with the inscription "You are standing halfway down Dominion Road" in reference to the song.

Transportation
Eden Valley is easily accessible by bus from the Central Business District.  By vehicle Eden Valley can be accessed from the Southern Motorway by taking the exit for Market Road via and the South Western Motorway by taking the exit for Queenstown Road off of the round-a-bout.

References

External links
Dominion Rd Main Street & Business Association
Albert-Eden Local Board
Maungawhau Heritage Walks:Four Mt Eden Neighbourhood Walks
Dominion Road video by the Mutton Birds

Suburbs of Auckland
Landforms of the Auckland Region